Julia Liikala (born 20 March 2001) is a Finnish ice hockey winger and member of the Finnish national ice hockey team, currently playing in the Naisten Liiga (NSML) with HIFK Naiset (Stadin Gimmat).

Playing career 
Liikala was born and raised in Peräseinäjoki, which was merged with Seinäjoki in 2005. As a child, she began playing ice hockey with the local club, S-Kiekko. Her debut in a women's league came at age 13, in a Naisten Suomi-sarja game between S-Kiekko and the Kisa-Eagles on 7 February 2015, where she scored the sixth goal in a 10–0 whitewash.

International play 
As a junior player with the Finnish national U18 team, Liikala participated in three IIHF World Women's U18 Championships, winning a bronze medal in 2019.

In 2019, Finnish national team head coach, Pasi Mustonen, described Liikala as having an extremely high potential of earning a roster position on the team for the 2022 Winter Olympics and she was selected to represent Finland at the 2020 IIHF Women's World Championship. She was officially named to the roster on 4 March 2020, prior to the cancellation of the tournament on 7 March 2020 due to the COVID-19 pandemic. She had previously appeared with the national team at all of the tournaments of the 2019–20 Women's Euro Hockey Tour.

Liikala ultimately made her World Championship debut in 2021, recording two assists in seven games and winning bronze. As predicted, she was selected to represent Finland in the women's ice hockey tournament at the 2022 Winter Olympics in Beijing and took home an Olympic bronze medal. 

References

External links 
 
 

2001 births
Living people
Finnish women's ice hockey forwards
HIFK Naiset players
HPK Kiekkonaiset players
Ice hockey players at the 2022 Winter Olympics
Medalists at the 2022 Winter Olympics
Olympic ice hockey players of Finland
Olympic bronze medalists for Finland
Olympic medalists in ice hockey
People from Seinäjoki
Sportspeople from South Ostrobothnia